Susan Silverman (born May 10, 1963) is an American Reform rabbi and the sister of comedians Laura Silverman and Sarah Silverman. In 1997, she and her husband, Yosef Abramowitz, co-authored the book Jewish Family and Life: Traditions, Holidays, and Values for Today’s Parents and Children. She worked as a congregational rabbi in Maryland, and as a Jewish educator in Boston, and moved to Israel in 2006.

Biography
Susan and her daughter Hallel Abramowitz are members of Women of the Wall, and in 2012, they were arrested for wearing prayer shawls at the Western Wall. News of this went viral after Sarah Silverman tweeted her support.

In 2013, Susan was named one of The Jewish Daily Forward'''s "Forward 50", and the Jewish erotica website Jewrotica.org named her one of the world's ten sexiest rabbis.

In 2015 Susan was in attendance when, for the first time, some of the Women of the Wall read from a full-size Torah scroll during a monthly prayer service at the Western Wall. Torah scrolls at the Western Wall are usually stored in the men's section, which women are forbidden from entering. On April 20, a group of male Jewish sympathizers handed a full-size Torah scroll over to Women of the Wall leaders. Some Haredi Orthodox men who had been praying at the Wall attacked the male sympathizers and tried to take the Torah scroll away from the women, and reportedly the men were removed by the police. The women were able to complete the prayer service. Susan claimed she chased away a man attempting to seize the Torah by threatening to touch him, saying, "I ran towards him with my hands in the air and shouted: 'I'm a woman! I'm a woman!' and he ran away because he didn't want me to touch him."

Susan lives in Jerusalem and has five children; two were adopted from Ethiopia. In the wake of the Amy Coney Barrett Supreme Court confirmation hearings, Silverman wrote an article discussing the use of Barrett's adopted children by both her detractors and defenders in terms of Silverman's own experience as an adoptive mother.

She has written articles for MyJewishLearning.com and written the book, Casting Lots: Creating a Family in a Beautiful, Broken World, which was published by Da Capo Press in March 2016. She also wrote the piece "Personal Reflection: Becoming a Woman of the Wall", which appears in the book The Sacred Calling: Four Decades of Women in the Rabbinate'', published in 2016.

In 2017, she founded "Second Nurture", an organization dedicated to supporting the path from foster care to adoption.

References

External links

Place of birth missing (living people)
1963 births
Living people
American emigrants to Israel
American Reform rabbis
People from Bedford, New Hampshire
Reform women rabbis
21st-century American Jews
Israeli Reform rabbis